Carlos Roberto da Cruz Junior, or simply Carlão (born 19 January 1986) is a Brazilian professional footballer who plays as a central defender for Santo André.

Club career

Corinthians
Carlão started his career with Brazilian powerhouse Corinthians where he played a total of 24 games, and scored 3 goals.

Sochaux
In July 2008, Carlão was transferred from Corinthians to the French Ligue 1 side FC Sochaux-Montbéliard, after completing a deal worth €800,000. He played for Sochaux from 2008 until 2014, appearing in 128 matches and scoring 1 goal.

APOEL
On 19 June 2014, after six French Ligue 1 seasons, he signed a two-year contract with APOEL from Cyprus. He made his APOEL debut against HJK Helsinki at Sonera Stadium on 30 July 2014, in a 2–2 first leg draw for the third qualifying round of the 2014–15 UEFA Champions League. Carlão appeared in every group stage match in APOEL's 2014–15 UEFA Champions League campaign and following his impressive performance at Camp Nou against FC Barcelona for the first week of the group stage, he was included in UEFA.com's team of the week as the best central defender. In his first season at APOEL, Carlão managed to win his first two career titles, as his team won both the Cypriot championship and the cup.

He scored his first official goal in his second season at APOEL, netting the winner in his team's 2–1 home victory against Asteras Tripoli for the group stage of the 2015–16 UEFA Europa League on 22 October 2015.

On 3 August 2016, Carlão agreed to extend his contract with APOEL until May 2019. However, on 10 January 2017, APOEL announced that they had agreed for his transfer to the Serie A side Torino, after the Italian club paid his €500,000 minimum release fee.

Torino
On 9 January 2017 he arrived in Italy, signing with Torino for two and a half seasons.

APOEL

Career statistics

Honours
APOEL
Cypriot First Division: 2014–15, 2015–16
Cypriot Cup: 2014–15

References

External links

globoesporte 

1986 births
Living people
Brazilian footballers
Association football defenders
Sport Club Corinthians Paulista players
FC Sochaux-Montbéliard players
APOEL FC players
Torino F.C. players
Associação Ferroviária de Esportes players
Cypriot First Division players
Serie A players
Ligue 1 players
Campeonato Brasileiro Série A players
Championnat National 2 players
Brazilian expatriate footballers
Expatriate footballers in France
Expatriate footballers in Cyprus
Expatriate footballers in Italy
Brazilian expatriate sportspeople in France
Brazilian expatriate sportspeople in Cyprus
Brazilian expatriate sportspeople in Italy
Footballers from São Paulo